Kunti, named at birth as Pritha, is one of the prominent characters of the Hindu epic Mahabharata. She is best known as the mother of the Pandavas and Karna, the main protagonists of the epic. She is described to be beautiful, intelligent, and shrewd.

Born to the Yadava chief Shurasena, Pritha was adopted by her childless uncle, Kuntibhoja, and was renamed Kunti. During her teenage years, she impressed sage Durvasa and was blessed with the knowledge of a divine mantra. Out of curiosity, she used the mantra to invoke the sun god Surya, and was blessed with a son named Karna. As he had been born out of wedlock, Kunti had to abandon him to save herself from dishonor.

After reaching adulthood, she chose Pandu, the king of Kuru, as her husband, but her married life was disturbed when Madri, princess of Madra, became Pandu's second wife. One day, Pandu was cursed that he would perish instantly if he tried to touch any of his wives with sexual intent. Filled with remorse, he abandoned his kingdom and chose to retire to the forest with his two wives. Kunti, upon her husband's request, used her mantra and was blessed with three children - Yudhishthira, Bhima, and Arjuna. Later, she shared her mantra with Madri, who was blessed with Nakula and Sahadeva. After Pandu died after attempting to engage in intercourse with Madri and the latter immolated herself, Kunti adopted her stepsons and took her children to Hastinapura, the capital of Kuru.

Along with the Pandavas, Kunti survived the Lakshagriha and during their hiding, she ordered Bhima to marry Hidimbi, a Rakshasi. Because of Kunti's misunderstanding, Draupadi, princess of Panchala, was married in a polyandrous union with the five Pandavas. After Indraprastha was established, Kunti stayed in Hastinapura and had a warm relationship with her sister-in-law, Gandhari. Before the Kurukshetra War, Kunti met Karna and asked him to join the Pandava side upon leaving his true heritage, but upon his refusal, she convinced him to spare all of her sons, but Arjuna. After Yudhishthira became the emperor of the Kurus, she retired to the forest and later died.

In Hindu tradition, she is extolled as one of the panchakanya ("five maidens"), archetypes of female chastity whose names are believed to dispel sin when recited. She is praised as the embodiment of a mature, foresighted, and dutiful woman.

Birth and early life

Kunti was the biological daughter of Shurasena, a Yadava ruler. Her birth name was Pritha. She is also said as the reincarnation of the goddess Siddhi. She was the sister of Vasudeva, the father of Krishna and shared a close relationship with Krishna. Her father gave Kunti to his childless cousin Kuntibhoja.

Once Rishi Durvasa visited Kuntibhoja. Being extremely pleased by the all comforts, patience, and devotion offered by Kunti, he offered her a mantra that would invoke any god of her choice and he would bless her with children.

Out of impetuous curiosity, Kunti invoked the god Surya. Bound by the power of the mantra, Surya blessed her with a child. To her surprise, the child was born with his sacred armour on. Out of fear of the public and with no choice, Kunti put the child in a basket and set him afloat the Ganga river. He later became famous as Karna.

Marriage and children 

Kuntibhoja organized Kunti's swayamvara. Kunti chose King Pandu of Hastinapur, making her the Queen of Hastinapur. Soon after, during his mission to expand his empire, Pandu, on Bhishma's proposal, married Madri, a princess of Madra in order to secure the vassalage of Madra. Kunti was disturbed by her husband's actions, but eventually reconciled with him and treated Madri as sister.

Pandu, while hunting in a forest, mistakenly shot and killed Rishi Kindama and his wife as they had taken the form of deer to mate. The dying sage then cursed him to die if he tries to embrace or touch his wives. Pandu renounced the kingdom and went into exile with Kunti and Madri.

Pandu could not have children from his wives as he was supposed to treat them as relatives due to the curse by sage Kindama. A remorseful Pandu renounced the kingdom and went into exile with Kunti and Madri. He met some sages and asked them away for heaven and salvation. They said, without children, one can never aspire for heaven. When Pandu expressed to Kunti his despair at the prospect of dying childless, she mentioned the boon granted to her. He happily advised her to beget children by suitable, illustrious men. Thus, Kunti used the boon granted to her by Sage Durvasa (which she had used to bear Karna) to bear three sons—Yudhishthira by Dharmaraja - god of Justice; Bhima by Vayu - god of wind, and Arjuna by Indra - the king of Svarga (Heaven). She also invoked Ashvins for Madri on her behest and Madri gave birth to twin sons, Nakula and Sahadeva.

Kunti gave special care to Madreyas (sons of Madri) especially Sahadeva the youngest one. Madri gave tribute to Kunti by saying

“You are blessed.There is none like youyou are my light,my guide,most respect-worthy,reater in status,purer in virtue.”I.125.66-68Widowhood

One day, Pandu, forgetting his curse, attempted to embrace his wife Madri. But, as a result of Kindama's curse, he died. Madri committed suicide out of remorse that caused her husband's death. Kunti was left helpless in the forest with her children.

After the death of Pandu and Madri, Kunti took care of all five Pandava children taking them back to Hastinapur. Dhritrashtra's sons never liked them. During their childhood, Duryodhana poisoned and tried to kill Bhima but he was saved. Kunti was hurt by this but was consoled by Vidura. Later the Kuru Princes were sent for training to Drona.

Hiding

After the princes finished their training, they returned to Hastinapura. After some time Duryodhana and his maternal uncle Shakuni tried to burn Pandavas alive along with Kunti for which they built the palace out of lac (Lakshagriha) in a village named Varanāvata. The Pandavas, though, managed to escape the house of lac with the help of Vidura through a secret tunnel.

After surviving from the Lakshagriha Kunti and five Pandavas lived in Ekachakra village. During their stay, Kunti and the Pandavas become aware of a demon, Bakasura, who ate people. Villagers had to send one member of their family and food to Bakasura, who devour both. When Kunti heard the cries of a Brahmin - who had provided her and her son's shelter in Ekachakra, Kunti consoled him and suggested that instead of a Brahmin's family, her son Bhima would face the demon. Kunti engineered a plot where Bhima would be able to face and kill the demon. The powerful Bhima brought his might to the fore and defeated Bakasura.

Later, Bhima slays the rakshasa Hidimba and he is beseeched by Hidimbi, Hidimba's sister, to wed her. Bhima is reluctant, but Kunti ordered Bhima to marry Hidimbi seeing merit in the woman. Hidimbi would go on to birth Ghatotkacha, who later takes part in the Kurukshetra War.

The Pandavas attended the swayamvara of Draupadi in Panchala. Arjuna was able to win Draupadi's hand. The Pandavas returned to their hut and said that they have bought alms (signifying Kanyadan). Kunti misunderstood them and asked the Pandavas to share whatever they had brought. Kunti was shocked after realizing the implications of her words, that is, all of the Pandavas married Draupadi thinking that they are obeying their mother's orders. Therefore, she scolded her children for treating a woman like alms. However, Draupadi accepted this as her fate.

Role in the events of Hastinapura
When Kunti, along with the Pandavas and Draupadi, returned to Hastinapura, they faced many problems including Draupadi's polyandry and succession dispute between Yudhishthira and Duryodhana. On the advice of Bhishma, Pandavas were given a barren land to rule which was developed into Indraprastha. However Kunti remained in Hastinapura with her co-sister, Gandhari.

When the Pandavas lose the kingdom in a dice game and are forced to go into exile for thirteen years, Kunti is forced by King Dhritarashtra to remain in the capital. She chose to stay in Vidura's house rather than the royal palace.

During the Kurukshetra war

As war approached, Kunti met Karna and in desperation to keep her all children alive, asked Karna to leave the side of Duryodhana and join the Pandavas. Karna denied the offer, as he could not betray his friend. However, he promised Kunti that he would not kill any of his brothers except Arjuna, thus following both Mitra dharma and Putra dharma. He also promised that at the end of the war she would still have five sons, the fifth one be either Arjuna or Karna himself.Despite supporting her children, Kunti stayed in the Kaurava camp along with her co-sister Gandhari. After the death of Karna, Kunti disclosed the secret of Karna's birth to Pandavas and others. All were shocked to learn the fact they committed fratricide. The Pandavas were furious with Kunti, especially Yudhisthira, who cursed Kunti and women of the world that they shall be unable to keep any secret anymore. If Kunti hadn't kept it a secret, there were chances that the war would've been averted and millions of lives would've been spared.

Later life and death

After the Kurukshetra war, Kunti lived with her sons for many years. After she felt that her job in the world was over, she moved to a forest near the Himalayas with her brothers-in-law Vidura and Dhritarashtra, Sanjaya and Dhritarashtra's wife Gandhari. Vidura died two years after they left. Later Sanjaya left for the Himalayas and the left ones perished in a forest fire.Mani pp.442-3

 Portrayal in the Mahabharata 
In the Mahabharata, Kunti is depicted as a mild-mannered woman with high moral and social values. She constantly guides her sons on their actions and keeps the family bound as one, never to have them fight among each other. She is said to have a great amount of respect for her brother-in-law Dhritarashtra and Vidura and for Dhritarashtra's wife Gandhari. She is also said to have an affectionate relationship with her daughter-in-law Draupadi.

Other versions of the Mahabharata depicts her to be shrewd and calculative. Early in her life, she rejects her son born out of wedlock (Karna) in societal fear, only to confess to him several years later, in solitude, that she birthed him. She tries to have him shift parties out of fear of losing her five sons. In exile with her husband Pandu, she shares her boon with his second wife Madri reluctantly and fears being overshadowed. It is said that Kunti did not share the boon for a second time with Madri, in the fear that Madri's children would outnumber her own.

In popular culture
Various actresses portrayed the role in various films and TV serials.
Durga Khote in Maharathi Karna (1944 film)
G Varalakshmi in Bhishma (1965 film)
M V Rajamma in Karnan (1964 film, Tamil)
Achala Sachdev in Mahabharat (1965 film)
Rushyendramani in Sri Krishnavataram (1967 film)
S. Varalakshmi in Daana Veera Soora Karna (1977 film)
Nazneen in Mahabharat series (1988)
Miriam Goldschmidt in The Mahabharata (1989 film)
Lata Haya in Krishna (series)
Neena Gupta in Ek Aur Mahabharat (1997 series)
Shalini Kapoor in Maharathi Karna (2001 series)
Sudha Chandran in Vishnu Puran(2003 series)
Jaya Bhattacharya in Kahaani Hamaaray Mahaabhaarat Ki (2008 series)
Shafaq Naaz in Star Plus's Mahabharat (2013 series)
Deepti Naval voiced the character in the animated movie Mahabharat (2013 film).
Priya Bathija in Suryaputra Karn (2015 series)
Sayantani Ghosh in Karn Sangini'' (2018 series)
 Reshma Konkar in Radhakrishn (2018 series)

References

External links

 Teachings of Queen Kunti

 People related to Krishna
 Characters in the Mahabharata
 Indian queen consorts
 Ancient Indian women
 Characters in the Bhagavata Purana